Dicymbium nigrum is a species of dwarf spider in the family Linyphiidae. It is found in Europe, Turkey, Caucasus, a range from Russia to Central Asia, and China.

Subspecies
These two subspecies belong to the species Dicymbium nigrum:
 (Dicymbium nigrum nigrum) (Blackwall, 1834)
 Dicymbium nigrum brevisetosum Locket, 1962

References

Linyphiidae
Articles created by Qbugbot
Spiders described in 1834